Agonopterix senecionis is a moth of the family Depressariidae. It is found from Germany, the Baltic region and Russia to the Iberian Peninsula, Italy and Romania.

The larvae feed on Doronicum, Senecio doria, Senecio doronicum, Senecio fluviatilis, Senecio nemorensis and Senecio ovatus. They initially mine the leaves of their host plant. The mine has the form of a large, elongate, full depth blotch, either along the midrib or following the leaf margin. Silk is deposited in the mine. Part of the frass is ejected, but some is deposited in the oldest part of the mine. Pupation takes place outside of the mine. Larvae can be found from May to July.

References

Moths described in 1864
Agonopterix
Moths of Europe